Andrew Jackson is an English Australian visual effects supervisor. He has worked on various feature films, including 300 (2006), Knowing (2009), Mad Max: Fury Road (2015), Dunkirk (2017), The King (2019), and Tenet (2020).

Jackson was nominated at the 88th Academy Awards for his work on the film Mad Max: Fury Road in the category of Best Visual Effects. His nomination was shared with Andy Williams, Dan Oliver, and Tom Wood.

He won at the 93rd Academy Awards for his work on the film Tenet in the category of Best Visual Effects. His nomination was shared with David Lee, Andrew Lockley and Scott Fisher.

Awards
 2021: Won Academy Award for Best Visual Effects – Tenet 
2021: Won BAFTA Award for Best Special Visual Effects – Tenet 
2018: Won Visual Effects Society Award for Outstanding Supporting Visual Effects in a Photoreal Feature – Dunkirk
2017: Nominated BAFTA Award for Best Special Visual Effects – Dunkirk
2015: Nominated Academy Award for Best Visual Effects – Mad Max: Fury Road
 2015: Nominated BAFTA Award for Best Special Visual Effects – Mad Max: Fury Road
 2015: Won AACTA Award for Best Visual Effects – Mad Max: Fury Road
 2010: Nominated Visual Effects Society Award for Best Single Visual Effect of the Year – Knowing

References

External links

Living people
Special effects people
Year of birth missing (living people)
Place of birth missing (living people)
Australian film people
Best Visual Effects Academy Award winners